Harold Beardmore  (13 November 1898 – 17 November 1968) was an Anglican bishop.

Education
He was educated at Berkhamsted School and King's College London.

Career
He was a chaplain to the Royal Navy from 1927 to 1947. He was appointed Dean of Port of Spain, Trinidad in 1947, and Archdeacon of Basutoland in 1952. He was appointed Bishop of St Helena in 1960.

Sources
The Times 19 November 1968

References

1898 births
1968 deaths
People educated at Berkhamsted School
Alumni of King's College London
Associates of King's College London
Officers of the Order of the British Empire
Archdeacons of Basutoland
20th-century Anglican Church of Southern Africa bishops
Anglican bishops of St Helena
Royal Navy chaplains
Deans of Trinidad